So Fresh: The Hits of Winter 2009 is a music album that was released on 19 June 2009. It contains a bonus DVD with 12 music videos.

Track listing (CD)
 The Black Eyed Peas – "Boom Boom Pow" (3:39)
 A. R. Rahman and The Pussycat Dolls featuring Nicole Scherzinger – "Jai Ho! (You Are My Destiny)" (3:42)
 Lady Gaga – "LoveGame" (3:36)
 Ciara featuring Justin Timberlake – "Love Sex Magic" (3:41)
 Pink – "Bad Influence" (3:36)
 The Script – "Breakeven" (4:21)
 Akon featuring Colby O'Donis and Kardinal Offishall – "Beautiful" (5:14)
 Kelly Clarkson – "I Do Not Hook Up" (3:20)
 Lady Sovereign – "So Human" (3:08)
 Natalie Bassingthwaighte – "1000 Stars" (4:00)
 Soulja Boy featuring Sammie – "Kiss Me thru the Phone" (3:15)
 Jessica Mauboy – "Because" (4:18)
 Wes Carr – "Fearless" (2:53)
 Kid Cudi vs. Crookers – "Day 'n' Nite" (2:44)
 Franz Ferdinand – "No You Girls" (3:42)
 Kings of Leon – "Revelry" (3:21)
 U2 – "Get On Your Boots" (3:25)
 Cassie Davis featuring Travie McCoy – "Differently" (3:50)
 Kanye West featuring Young Jeezy – "Amazing" (3:58)
 The Presets – "If I Know You" (4:28)

Track listing (DVD)
 The Black Eyed Peas – "Boom Boom Pow"
 Lady Gaga – "LoveGame"
 Ciara featuring Justin Timberlake – "Love Sex Magic"
 The Script – "Breakeven"
 Akon featuring Colby O'Donis and Kardinal Offishall – "Beautiful"
 Kelly Clarkson – "I Do Not Hook Up"
 Lady Sovereign – "So Human"
 Natalie Bassingthwaighte – "1000 Stars"
 Soulja Boy featuring Sammie – "Kiss Me thru the Phone"
 Franz Ferdinand – "No You Girls"
 Cassie Davis featuring Travis McCoy – "Differently"
 Kanye West featuring Young Jeezy – "Amazing"

Charts

Year-end charts

Certifications

References 

2009 compilation albums
So Fresh albums
2009 in Australian music